Colls may refer to:

Caroline Sturdy Colls ((born 1985), British historian
Ebenezer Colls (1812–1887), English marine painter
Kevin Colls (1922–2009), Australian rules footballer
Robert Colls (born 1949), British historian
Thomas Colls (1822–1898), Australian politician